In the run-up to the 2011 Scottish Parliament election, several polling organisations carried out public opinion polling in regards to voting intentions. Results of such polls are displayed below.  The first figure for each party is for the 1st, first-past-the-post (constituency) vote; the second figure is for the 2nd, proportional representation (regional) vote.

ARPO, ICM, Ipsos MORI, Populus, TNS-BMRB (formerly TNS System Three) and YouGov were members of the British Polling Council, and abided by its disclosure rules. Progressive Partnership-Scottish Opinion and Panelbase, although members of the Market Research Society, were not members of the BPC and did not publish detailed methodology and findings.

Graphical summary
The constituency vote is shown as semi-transparent lines, while the regional vote is shown in full lines.

Constituency vote

Graphical summary

Poll results

Regional vote

Graphical summary

Poll results

Scotland 2011
Opinion polling for Scottish Parliament elections
Opinion polling for United Kingdom votes in the 2010s